The 2003 Ford 400 was a NASCAR Winston Cup Series racing event that took place on November 16, 2003, at Homestead-Miami Speedway in Homestead, Florida, United States. This was the last race ever for NASCAR with title sponsorship from Winston, breaking a partnership beginning in 1972. Starting in 2004, new series sponsor Nextel would take over.

Summary
Ken Schrader, Kyle Petty, Mike Wallace, Derrike Cope, and Rich Bickle had all failed to qualify for the race. Kyle Busch was set to make his Cup Series debut in this race, driving the No. 60 Ditech Chevrolet Monte Carlo for Hendrick Motorsports, but withdrew before the event.

Bill Elliott dominated the race, leading 189 out of 267 laps, before cutting a tire and losing the lead on the final lap. Bobby Labonte would pass him and win the race, which would be his final NASCAR Winston Cup Series victory. Ten cautions were called, slowing the field for a total of 60 laps, while the lead changed 21 times between 12 drivers. Despite an engine failure on lap 28 which relegated him to a last-place finish, Matt Kenseth maintained his points lead over Jimmie Johnson and won the 2003 NASCAR Winston Cup Series championship.

This would be the last NASCAR Winston Cup Series race for Ron Hornaday Jr. until the 2015 Folds of Honor QuikTrip 500.

Race Results

Failed to Qualify
49 - Ken Schrader
45 - Kyle Petty
09 - Mike Wallace
79 - Derrike Cope
78 - Rich Bickle
60 - Kyle Busch (withdrew)

References

Ford 400
Ford 400
NASCAR races at Homestead-Miami Speedway
November 2003 sports events in the United States